Chaubepur is a suburb in Kanpur, India, situated about 25 km from Kanpur on the Grand Trunk Road to Delhi. It is 7 km from Mandhana, a Kanpur suburb. It comes under Kanpur Metropolitan Area. The population was 4000 at the 2011 census. It has 75% of literacy.

Travel

By road
Chaubepur has a bus station and UPSRTC Busses of Kanpur for Aligarh, Delhi, Ghaziabad, Bareilly etc. are available. City buses from Kanpur Metropolitan Bus Service are available here for Kanpur City.

By rail
Chaubepur has a railway station on the Kanpur-Farrukhabad line. Station code is CBR

By air
IIT Kanpur Airstrip is nearest airstrip. Nearest domestic airport is at Kanpur and nearest international airport is at Lucknow

Tourist attractions
The pilgrimage spot of Bithoor is 13 km from the town. Shoban mandir is located 12 km away. Blue world theme park is located 8 km and Sudhansu ashram is 12 km from town.

Noneshwar Mahadev Temple
A temple dedicated to Shiva is situated at the bank of Non river in a nearby village named Nonha Narshinghpur. A stone inscription of Nagari script and Sanskrit language present in this temple, indicates that the temple was originally built by the king Mihira Bhoja of Gurjara-Pratihara dynasty in 9th century CE.

References

Neighbourhoods in Kanpur